Prace or Práče may refer to places:

Prace, Czech Republic
Prace, Poland
Práče